Hardenbergia violacea is a species of flowering plant in the family Fabaceae and is endemic to Australia. It is known in Australia by the common names false sarsaparilla, purple coral pea and waraburra. Elsewhere it is also called purple twining-pea, vine-lilac and wild sarsaparilla. It is a prostrate or climbing subshrub with egg-shaped to narrow lance-shaped leaves and racemes of mostly purple flowers.

Description
The leaves are leathery, glabrous and paler on the lower surface. The flowers are usually purple or violet, but pink, white and other colours sometimes occur.

H. violacea regrows from its roots after fire. The roots were experimented with by early European settlers as a substitute for sarsaparilla.

Taxonomy
False sarsaparilla was first formally described in 1793 by George Voorhelm Schneevoogt who gave it the name Glycine violacea in his book, Icones Plantarum Rariorum. In 1940, William T. Stearn changed the name to Hardenbergia violacea.

Distribution and habitat
It occurs in eastern Queensland, eastern New South Wales, south-eastern Victoria and southern South Australia. There is a single population in Tasmania, where the species is listed as "endangered" under the Tasmanian Government Threatened Species Protection Act 1995.

Use in horticulture
Hardenbergia violacea is widely grown as a garden plant, with many cultivars now available. It is hardy in mild and coastal areas of the United Kingdom where temperatures do not fall below , but it does require a sheltered, south or west facing situation. Alternatively it may be grown indoors with full daylight, for instance in an unheated conservatory or greenhouse. It has been given the Royal Horticultural Society's Award of Garden Merit.

The seeds of H. violacea remain viable for many years and propagation is from seeds that have been treated by adding boiling water to them or by abrading the seed coat. Plants prefer full sun in well-drained soil, are moderately frost-tolerant and respond well to pruning.

References

External links
Australian Cultivar Registration Authority - Hardenbergia violacea 'Happy Wanderer'

Fabales of Australia
Flora of Queensland
Flora of Victoria (Australia)
Flora of Tasmania
Flora of New South Wales
Flora of South Australia
Plants described in 1793
Garden plants